Dunshaughlin ( or locally ) is a town in County Meath, Ireland. A commuter town for nearby Dublin, Dunshaughlin more than tripled in population (from 1,275 to 4,035 inhabitants) between the 1991 and 2016 censuses.

History

Foundation

Dunshaughlin is named for Saint Seachnall, who established a church there in the 5th century. The oldest reference to the place name is an entry in the Annála Uladh from the year 801, where the name takes the form "Domnaig Sechnaill". The word "Domnach", used in this way, can be attributed to churches which originate from the beginnings of Christianity in Ireland.

Máel Sechnaill mac Domnaill was an ancestor from which the principal family of Brega, Ó Maoilsheachlainn, is descended. Dunshaughlin (or more specifically, the townland of Lagore) is famous for an ancient crannóg or settlement from the 7th century where a number of Irish antiquities were discovered.

Workhouse
Approximately  from the village is a preserved workhouse from the Great Famine. Designed to accommodate 400 inmates, it cost about £6,000 to build, all told. It was declared fit for habitation on 12 May 1841 and received its first admissions on 17 May. During the famine period, in the mid-1840s, elements of the workhouse were converted to accommodate additional inmates, and a burial ground was located to the rear. Occupancy declined after the famine. During the First World War, the building was used to house Belgian refugees, some of whom died there and were buried in the paupers' graveyard. In 1920–21, the building was taken over by the Black and Tans, who used it as a barracks during the Irish War of Independence. After the workhouse system was abolished in 1922, following the conclusion of the war and the establishment of Irish Free State, the facility served as a school, courthouse, and factory (among other things). As of 2002, parts of the building were being used as a guest residence.

Demographics
Dunshaughlin is 29 km from Dublin on the R147, and is a growing satellite town of that city. Between the 1991 and 2011 census, the town's population had more than tripled from 1,275 inhabitants to 3,903 people. By the time of the 2016 census, this had increased to 4,035.

Amenities
Several housing estates centre on the main street, with multiple retail units consisting of newsagents, pubs, takeaway food outlets, clothing stores, and banks. There is also a business park on the outskirts of the town.

Dunshaughlin houses a number of public amenities, including a library, a health centre, and the Meath County Council civic offices. A community and sports centre was opened on the grounds of Dunshaughlin Community College in 2000. The centre is operated by a voluntary board of management.

Education
Dunshaughlin has two primary schools, Gaelscoil na Ríthe and St. Seachnall's, and one secondary school, Dunshaughlin Community College.
St. Seachnall's was founded in 1835. As of 2019, it had 552 students, both boys and girls. Gaelscoil na Ríthe (an Irish medium school) was established in 1985 by a group of parents from the Dunshaughlin, Drumree, and Culmullen areas. A new building was constructed in 1996 and, as of 2019, the school had an enrollment of 226 pupils. Dunshaughlin Community College (DCC), established in 1933, is a co-educational school which is part of the Louth and Meath Education and Training Board. Construction was completed on an extension at the school in 2013, and was officially opened on 29 November 2014.

Transport
Dunshaughlin is located at a junction between the R147 and R125 regional roads, and approximately 1 km from the M3 motorway. It is served by Bus Éireann commuter bus services to Dublin, including route 109, which generally runs at a frequency of every half-hour.

Sport

The town is represented in sport by men's and ladies Gaelic football teams. The Dunshaughlin GAA men's team were Meath Senior Football Championship 3 years in a row between 2000 and 2003. The local soccer club is Dunshaughlin Youths, which fields teams in the North Dublin Schoolboys League.

The local basketball club, Dunshaughlin Rockets, compete in both the North East Basketball League and the Dublin Ladies Basketball League. Dunshaughlin community college has won both a girl's u16 All-Ireland title, a second-year girl's All-Ireland a boy's u19 All-Ireland title.

Dunshaughlin Athletic Club is traditionally considered a long-distance running club. However, club members have also entered juvenile sprinting competitions. The town's golf course is the "Black Bush Golf Club". Around  outside the village a new golfing resort designed by Jack Nicklaus has been created at Killeen Castle. The course hosted the 2011 Solheim Cup.

The town also has a strong association with horse racing, in particular National Hunt racing. The leading flat race sprinter Sole Power, dual winner of both the Nunthorpe Stakes and the King's Stand Stakes, is trained near the town by Edward Lynam.

Events
The Dunshaughlin Harvest Festival is a three-day culture festival, usually taking place towards the end of September. It is a non-profit event, organized and run by local volunteers.

Gallery

See also
List of towns and villages in Ireland

References

External links

 Meath County Council - Dunshaughlin Local Area Plan 2009-2015

Towns and villages in County Meath